Simon Lake (September 4, 1866 – June 23, 1945) was a Quaker American mechanical engineer and naval architect who obtained over two hundred patents for advances in naval design and competed with John Philip Holland to build the first submarines for the United States Navy.

Biography
Born in Pleasantville, New Jersey on September 4, 1866. Lake joined his father's foundry business after attending public schools in New Jersey and Pennsylvania. Lake had a strong interest in undersea travel.

He built his first submarine, Argonaut Junior, in 1894 in response to an 1893 request from the US Navy for a submarine torpedo boat. As a result of lessons learned on that journey, he rebuilt it into the  Argonaut 2.

Neither Argonaut nor Lake's following submarine, Protector, built in 1901, were accepted by the Navy. Protector was the first submarine to have diving planes mounted forward of the conning tower and a flat keel. Four diving planes allowed Protector to maintain depth without changing ballast tank levels, and to dive level without a down-angle. Level diving was a feature of several subsequent Lake designs, notably the first three US G-class submarines. Protector also had a lock-out chamber for divers to leave the submarine. Lake, lacking Holland's financial backing, was unable to continue building submarines in the United States. He sold Protector to Imperial Russia in 1904 as the Osetr and spent the next seven years in Europe designing submarines for the Austro-Hungarian Navy, Germany's Kaiserliche Marine, and the Imperial Russian Navy (Osetr- and Kaiman-class submarines).

He lived in Milford, Connecticut from 1907 until his death in 1945.

In 1922 the United States and other countries signed treaties limiting the size of their navies. This led to financial difficulties which forced the Lake Torpedo Boat Company to close in the mid-1920s. Lake redesigned the former  as the Arctic exploration submarine Nautilus, used by Sir Hubert Wilkins in a 1931 expedition. He also advised the United States Navy on submarine technology and maritime salvage during World War II.
Lake was a member, Freemason of Monmouth Lodge No. 172 in Atlantic Highlands, New Jersey. He later affiliated with Ansantawae Lodge No. 89 in Milford, Connecticut.

He died on June 23, 1945.

Legacy

By his death, Lake had witnessed the submarine's arrival as a front-line weapon in the US Navy.

The US Navy built a class of two submarine tenders named in his honor, the
Simon Lake class;  was in service between 1964 and 1999.

In 1989 Simon Lake was inducted into the Toms River (New Jersey) Schools' Hall of Fame.

A Milford, Connecticut grammar school named in his honor closed in June 2010. Lake's Bay in West Atlantic City, New Jersey is where he tested prototypes.

An Atlantic Highlands, NJ street, Simon Lake Drive, at the marina was named in his honor.

References

Bibliography
 
 John J. Poluhowich, Argonaut: The Submarine Legacy of Simon Lake. Texas A&M University Press, November 1999,

External links

 "Submarine - The Autobiography of Simon Lake" pdf file
 "Lusitania Treasures To Be Raised" Popular Mechanics, February 1932
 "Pumping Cargo From Sunken Ships - Submarine Builder Designs Unique Vessel For Bulk Salvage Work" Popular Science, December 1934
 "Baby Submarine On Wheels To Seek Treasure" Popular Mechanics March 1933
 "Hard-Boil for Treasure" Popular Mechanics, November 1930, pp 770-774 
 Simon Lake Website
 Whitman, Edward C., "The Submarine Heritage of Simon Lake", Undersea Warfare, Fall 2002, Issue 16

1866 births
1945 deaths
American engineers
American inventors
People from Pleasantville, New Jersey
Submarine pioneers
Engineers from New Jersey